Clarence Lemuel "Red" Phillips (November 3, 1908 – September 23, 1988) was a professional baseball player.  He was a right-handed pitcher over parts of two seasons (1934, 1936) with the Detroit Tigers.  For his career, he compiled a 4-4 record, with a 6.42 earned run average, and 18 strikeouts in  innings pitched.

An alumnus of East Central University, he was born in Pauls Valley, Oklahoma and died in Wichita, Kansas at the age of 79.

External links

1908 births
1988 deaths
Detroit Tigers players
Major League Baseball pitchers
Baseball players from Oklahoma
Bartlesville Broncos players
Beaumont Exporters players
Montreal Royals players
East Central Tigers baseball players
Indianapolis Indians players
Toledo Mud Hens players
Oklahoma City Indians players
People from Pauls Valley, Oklahoma